John Horn Riley (June 13, 1909 – March 22, 1993) was an American football tackle.  He played college football at Northwestern  University and professionally in the National Football League (NFL) for the Boston Redskins.  Riley was inducted into the College Football Hall of Fame in 1988.

Early life
Riley was born in Chicago and attended New Trier High School in Winnetka, Illinois, as well as St. John's Northwestern Military Academy in Delafield, Wisconsin.  While at St. Johns, he participated in rowing and captained a championship crew in 1927.

College career
Riley attended and played college football at Northwestern University.  While he was there, Northwestern had a 20–5–1 record and won two Big Ten Conference championships.  He was named an All-American in 1931.

Riley also wrestled at Northwestern and was the national collegiate heavyweight champion in 1931 and 1932.  He then won a silver medal in wrestling at the 1932 Summer Olympics, behind Swede Johan Richthoff and ahead of Austrian Nickolaus Hirschl.

Professional career
After college, Riley played professional football in the National Football League for the Boston Redskins (later Washington Redskins now Washington Football Team) in 1933.

After football, Riley became a professional wrestler for two years and retired undefeated after 132 professional matches.

Post-sports
Riley entered the United States Marine Corps during World War II and rose to the rank of major.  After the war he worked as a manufacturer's representative in Kenilworth, Illinois.  Also, from 1948 to 1957, Riley was the Northwestern University wrestling coach.

References

1909 births
1993 deaths
American football tackles
Boston Redskins players
Northwestern Wildcats football players
Northwestern Wildcats wrestlers
All-American college football players
College Football Hall of Fame inductees
Medalists at the 1932 Summer Olympics
Olympic silver medalists for the United States in wrestling
Wrestlers at the 1932 Summer Olympics
United States Marine Corps personnel of World War II
Sportspeople from Chicago
People from Kenilworth, Illinois
Players of American football from Chicago
Olympic wrestlers of the National Football League